Julia Carvalho is a mining engineer, businesswoman and corporate executive from Portugal. She is the Corporate Manager of Growth Markets in Africa at International Business Machines (IBM), effective December 2021. She is based in Luanda, Angola

Early life and education
Carvalho holds a bachelor's degree from the University of Lisbon, in Portugal. Her degree of Master of Science in Mining Engineering and her degree of Doctor of Philosophy
in Engineering, were both obtained from the University of Lisbon as well. Over the years, she has attended energy, leadership and financial management training programs from MIT Sloan School of Management, Texas A&M University and Católica Lisbon School of Business & Economics.

Career
Before her current assignment, Carvalho was the General Manager at IBM for Angola, Mozambique, Cape Verde and Sao Tome. In that capacity, she led IBM focus on the expansion of Hybrid Cloud and Artificial Intelligence in these markets.

Prior to her joining IBM, she worked at Halliburton, the American multinational corporation, as the head of sales in their Landmark Software & Services Unit. Before that, she was Professor of Engineering at the University of Lisbon.

She previously worked as a consultant at Sonangol and Sonagas.  She also served as head of the Natural Resources Business Unit at Sinfic in Angola.

See also
 Eva Ngigi–Sarwari
 Philippa Ngaju Makobore

References

External links
Julia Carvalho is now GM for IBM Growth Markets in Africa As of 16 December 2021.

Living people
Portuguese engineers
Portuguese women engineers
Portuguese people
University of Lisbon alumni
21st-century women engineers
Year of birth missing (living people)
Portuguese women scientists
Portuguese women in business
IBM people
IBM Women